Annaberg Historic District is a historic section of Saint John, United States Virgin Islands where the Annaberg sugar plantation ruins are located. The district is located on the north shore of the island west of Mary's Point in the Maho Bay quarter.

Gallery

References

External links
 
Annaberg Historic District, NPS entry.

Historic districts on the National Register of Historic Places in the United States Virgin Islands
National Register of Historic Places in Virgin Islands National Park
Sugar plantations in Saint John, U.S. Virgin Islands
Plantations in the Danish West Indies
History of sugar